Vatazhnoye is a rural locality (a selo) and the administrative center of Vatazhensky Selsoviet, Krasnoyarsky District, Astrakhan Oblast, Russia. The population was 1,242 as of 2010. There are 24 streets.

Geography 
Vatazhnoye is located 6 km northeast of Krasny Yar (the district's administrative centre) by road. Kondakovka is the nearest rural locality.

References 

Rural localities in Krasnoyarsky District, Astrakhan Oblast